Jacobelli Silvestri (died 1516) was a Roman Catholic prelate who served as Bishop of Alatri (1493–1516).

Biography
On 15 Apr 1493, Jacobelli Silvestri was appointed during the papacy of Pope Alexander VI as Bishop of Alatri.
He served as Bishop of Alatri until his death in 1516.

References

External links and additional sources
 (for Chronology of Bishops) 
 (for Chronology of Bishops)  

16th-century Italian Roman Catholic bishops
Bishops appointed by Pope Alexander VI
1516 deaths